Baltic Match Throwing is an annual outdoor track and field competition between the Baltic states (Estonia, Latvia and Lithuania). The competition features shot put, discus throw, hammer throw and javelin throw for both men and women. In addition to the senior events, these are also age category events for under-18, under-20 and under-23 athletes. Belarus was invited to compete at the 2014 edition.

Editions

See also
European Throwing Cup

References

Sport in the Baltic states
Recurring sporting events established in 2011
2011 establishments in Latvia
Annual sporting events
International athletics competitions hosted by Estonia
International athletics competitions hosted by Latvia
International athletics competitions hosted by Lithuania
May sporting events
Spring (season) events (Northern Hemisphere)